Choi Seo-ah (Korean: 최서아; born Choi Jun-hee on 3 September 1993), better known by her stage name Juniel, (Hangul: 주니엘, often stylized as JUNIEL) is a South Korean singer-songwriter. She began her career in Japan before eventually debuting in South Korea. She was first known as 'Junie', but eventually changed her stage name to 'Juniel', which was derived from combining her name, Junie, and L for 'love'. She was also a member of the duo Romantic J with CNBLUE's Lee Jong-hyun under former label FNC Entertainment. In 2016, Juniel announced on her social media that she legally changed her native name from 최준희 (Choi Jun-hee) to 최서아 (Choi Seo-ah).

Life and career

1993–10: Early life and career beginnings
Choi Jun-hee was born on 3 September 1993, in South Korea. As a child, she began dancing and singing, with popular soloist BoA being her inspiration. She started playing the guitar in her third year of junior high school. She wrote her first song, "Boy", when she was sixteen, which was later included on her first Japanese EP. While studying in Japan, she won the Japanese audition program Niji Iro Supernova, beating out many other singers and songwriters from all over the country. Juniel started her Korean training at Good Entertainment, the same agency which formerly housed celebrities such as G.NA, the Wonder Girls' Yubin and After School's Uee. She later auditioned at FNC Entertainment, and became a trainee the same day as CN Blue's Jung Yong-hwa.

2011: Ready Go, Dream and Hope, and label change
Juniel made her official debut on 29 April 2011 releasing her first Japanese EP titled Ready Go. She was the opening act for Oh Won-bin's live concert Good For You, which was held at Akasaka Blitz on 26 June 2011. Juniel was later the opening act for F.T. Island's Messenger tour, performing at their Zepp Tokyo concert on 6 July 2011.

Juniel's second Ep Dream & Hope released on 12 July 2011. The fourth song on the album, "Kamen" (仮面; "Mask"), was inspired by the musical Dr. Jekyll and Mr. Hyde. In November, Juniel underwent a label change to Warner Music Japan and made her major debut with the single "Forever". The song was written to give support to those who suffered from the 2011 Tōhoku earthquake and tsunami, and was released on 2 November 2011. "Forever" was later selected as a monthly recommendation by CD shops in Japan, and was used as the ending theme song for Gamers Yoasobi Sanshimai. "Travel", a B-side from the single, was also used for a television commercial. Juniel was selected as the opening act for Lawson Presents Music For All All For One Supported by Skapa! which was held at the Yoyogi National Gymnasium on 24 December 2011.

2012: My First June, 1&1 and South Korean debut
Juniel released her second Japanese single, "Sakura: Todokanu Omoi" (さくら～とどかぬ想い～), on 15 February 2012. The song was used as an ending theme for various television shows, such as Music B.B., Music Focus and King Kong no Arukoto Naikoto. She appeared on MBC's documentary show K-Pop Star Captivates the World on 22 April 2012, where her hype track, "Fool" (feat. Jung Yong-hwa (CN Blue)), was released.

Her debut Korean single, "Illa Illa", was released on 7 June 2012. She released her first EP My First June and held her debut showcase on the same day. Her self-composed songs, which were previously released in Japan, were also included on the release. "Illa Illa" was later chosen as the theme song for the character Im Mae-ari, played by Yoon Ji-ni, in the popular Korean drama series A Gentleman's Dignity. Juniel made a cameo appearance on the series as a street performer in Hongdae. In August 2012, she was chosen to endorse Bean Pole's sub-brand Bike Repair Shop alongside the indie band Busker Busker.

Juniel's second EP, 1&1, was released on 20 November 2012. 1&1 peaked at number four on the Gaon weekly album charts, and number twenty-one on the monthly charts, selling a total of 3,097 copies. The music video for its lead single, "Bad Man", was released on the same day, peaking at number four on both the Gaon and Billboard Korea K-Pop Hot 100 charts. Other songs included on the album are Korean remakes of "Boy", "Oh Happy Day", "Cat Day" and a new song co-written and co-composed by Juniel titled, "Happy Ending".

2013: Juni, Fall in L, DOKKUN PROJECT and Romantic J
Juniel received the Rookie Award at the 27th Golden Disk Awards on 15 January 2013, in Kuala Lumpur, Malaysia, and was invited to perform at MIDEM festival's Happy Hour Business Party in Cannes, France, on 27 January 2013. She released her debut Japanese studio album Juni on 6 March 2013, which consists of eleven self-composed songs and a Japanese version of the duet "Babo" with CNBLUE's Jung Yong-hwa.

A month later, her third extended play titled Fall in L released on 25 April 2013. The EP is composed of four songs: the lead track "Gwiyeoun Namja" (귀여운 남자; "Pretty Boy"), "Date" (데이트), "Jamkkodae" (잠꼬대; "Sleep Talking") and "My Lips". On the same day of its release, "Gwiyeoun Namja" topped several Korean real-time music charts. On 2 May 2013, Juniel was appointed honorary ambassador for teenagers at the 2013 Teenage Family Month Ceremony.

On 18 July, Juniel released a digital single titled "Love You More Than Ever" featuring Hanhae from PHANTOM as a part of producer Kim Do Hoon's 'DOKKUN PROJECT'. 
The song immediately topped the online Korean music charts such as Bugs, Soribada & Naver Music after its release.

On 9 December, Juniel and CNBLUE's Lee Jonghyun formed a duet and released a winter special digital album called 'Romantic J' with the song titled "Love Falls".
The song was inspired by the movie "Music and Lyrics", where Lee Jonghyun is the music composer and Juniel as the lyricist.

2014–2015: I Think I'm in Love and collaboration
FNC Entertainment has confirmed Juniel's comeback, on 29 September with her title track I Think I'm in Love. It has been over one year and five months since her last comeback with Pretty Boy.

In April 2015, Juniel collaborated with Teen Top's Niel for release a duet called "Spring Love". Niel & Juniel had their debut stage on Mnet's M! Countdown on 16 April 2015.

On 21 August, Juniel made a comeback with her second digital single "Sorry" on Music Bank.

2016–present: Label change and Poetic Narrator
On 20 January 2016, FNC Entertainment announced that Juniel would not be continuing her contract. The agency stated that "Juniel's contract expires at the end of the month. Both parties discussed whether or not to renew the contract, and in accordance with Juniel's own intention, we′ve decided not to renew the contract." On 22 February, a C9 Entertainment representative said that they've recently signed a contract with Juniel.

In 2020, she formed the duo Poetic Narrator with musician/producer Doko, and announced that she would be going by her given name, Seo Ah. They released their mini-album, Poetic License on 23 January.

On 28 December 2021, C9 Entertainment announced that Juniel would not be renewing her contract.

On June 11, 2022, Juniel signs a contract with K Tigers Entertainment.

Discography

Studio albums
 Juni (2013)

Awards and nominations

Filmography

Endorsements 
 2012: Bean Pole's Bike Repair Shop (with Busker Busker)
 2013: Sunny10 (with EXO)
 2013: Elite (with Infinite)
 2014: Buckaroo Jeans (China)

Fanclub 
 Official Fanclub Name:  Banila 바닐라. Combination of Bbanini (her first guitar) and 'illa illa' (her debut song)
 Announced on:  26 December 2012

Equipment
Juniel is often shown in videos playing a 6 string acoustic Taylor 214ce, made in Taylor's Tecate factory (Mexico), on 7 September 2011.  It was the 110th guitar made in the factory that day.

References

External links

  at C9 Entertainment 
  on Warner Music Japan

1993 births
Living people
K-pop singers
Japanese-language singers
South Korean expatriates in Japan
South Korean women pop singers
South Korean female idols
South Korean J-pop singers
South Korean pop rock singers
School of Performing Arts Seoul alumni
21st-century South Korean singers
21st-century South Korean women singers